Pro-Pain Pro Wrestling, or 3PW, was a hardcore professional wrestling promotion based in Philadelphia, Pennsylvania. It ran many shows from the former ECW Arena. Following the close of Extreme Championship Wrestling, many former ECW veterans, such as Raven, The Sandman, Al Snow and Sabu, made frequent appearances in the promotion

History
The promotion was founded by Jasmin St. Claire and Brian "The Blue Meanie" Heffron and they were later joined by former Extreme Championship Wrestling promoter Tod Gordon. In the beginning, 3PW brought in wrestling greats like Dusty Rhodes, Terry Funk, Abdullah The Butcher and Bam Bam Bigelow to add to the roster. The first 3PW shows ran at the ECW Arena, but when XPW Owner Rob Black signed an exclusive lease to the arena, 3PW moved to The Electric Factory.

In 2004, 3PW had a show featuring a Blue World Order reunion with Blue Meanie and Stevie Richards. The next month, 3PW hosted an NWA Florida X Division Championship match between Roderick Strong and Mikey Batts.

In December 2004, however, problems began to surface. 3PW booker Tod Gordon resigned, walking out during a 3PW event following an argument with 3PW officials when there was apparently no money to pay wrestlers, security and other staff for the event. In April, Jasmin St. Claire was officially replaced as CEO by Richard McDonald. Rockin' Rebel took over as booker, but he and the Blue Meanie soon became involved in a business dispute with Pro Wrestling Unplugged owners Johnny Kashmere and Trent Acid. When St. Claire stopped receiving her royalty checks, she responded by putting the promotion up for sale in a one-day auction on Ebay.com although, no one responded to the $180,000 asking price. Blue Meanie attempted to resurrect the company, but was unable to find an investor. The company's final show was on June 18, 2005. In 2007 Force Entertainment began Professionally repacking and distributing 3PW Events throughout Australia commercially and through the companies' websites, as such the DVD releases started turning up in supermarkets, video stores, and retail outlets.

Alumni

Male wrestlers

Stables and tag teams

Managers and valets

Commentators and interviewers

Other personnel

Championships

3PW World Heavyweight Championship

3PW Tag Team Championship

References

External links 
3PW title histories
3PW at Online World of Wrestling
CageMatch.de - Pro Pain Pro Wrestling 

Entertainment companies established in 2002
Organizations established in 2002
Entertainment companies disestablished in 2005
Organizations disestablished in 2005
American independent professional wrestling promotions based in Pennsylvania
2002 establishments in Pennsylvania